The Coomera Cubs Baseball Club is a baseball club located on the Gold Coast in Queensland, that participates in the Greater Brisbane League and the Gold Coast Baseball Association League. The club is also a host to the annual Summer Classic.

History 
The club has a history dating back to the 1990s and was originally known as the Coomera Cougars. The club shared playing fields on the eastern side of the M1 where the Coomera Soccer fields now reside. The club was moved in the early 2000s to the current site at Gambamora Park and was officially incorporated in 2006 as the Coomera Cubs Baseball Club Inc. That year the club entered multiple Junior and Senior teams in the Gold Coast Baseball Association competition.

GBL 
In 2017/18 the club entered into the Senior Div 1, Div 2, U16 Div 1 and U14 Div1 GBL competition for the first time. The following year saw the U16 team make the grand final and the U14 team win the championship. 2019/20 in the third year of the GBL senior competition the Senior Div 1 and Div 2 both made the playoffs. The Div 2 side sitting equal top of the table after the regular season on for and against and narrowly losing to Surfers on head to head results for the minor premiership.

In what can only be described as unprecedented times the season finals series were not played due to the COVID-19 pandemic. As a result the competition was awarded based on placings during the regular season. Div 1 came 4th and Div 2 came 2nd.

Junior Baseball Academy 
In 2013 the club introduced the first club based junior elite academy on the Gold Coast. This academy is aimed at 10 to 14 year olds and in 2019 was run inhouse at the club by the team at South Coast Academy of Sport. The academy continues to support the club's training activities.

Little League 
In 2018 there was a large representation from the club that represented the Gold Coast at the Little League District State Titles. This Gold Coast team became the first team from Queensland to win National Little League Australian Championships in June 2018 and progress to the Little League World series.

Notable players 

Aaron Whitefield (Minnesota Twins)

Josh Warner (Philadelphia Phillies)

Darren Trainor (Lewis-Clark State College)

Jack Waters (Arizona Western College)

Liam Sherer (Canberra Cavalry, Colby Trojans)

Records
Notable individual records set in one game, these include all games between the 2020-2021 season from Div 1 and 2

Division 1 roster

Division 2 roster

GCBA D2

Managers 
Phil Stockman - (2018-2019)

Andrew Azzopardi - (2019–2020)

Case Bunting - (2020–present)

Assistant Coach 
Scott Nieass - (2019–2021)

Glen Hall - (2021–present)

Location

References

External links 
Coomera Cubs website
Baseball Queensland

Baseball teams in Australia
Australian baseball clubs
Baseball teams established in 2006
Sporting teams based on the Gold Coast, Queensland